Eupyrgulina is a genus of small sea snails, pyramidellid gastropod mollusks in the tribe Chrysallidini within the family Pyramidellidae.

Distribution
The genus mainly occurs in the Arabian Sea.

Life habits
Little is known about the biology of the members of this genus. As is true of most members of the Pyramidellidae sensu lato, they are ectoparasites.

Species
Species within the genus Eupyrgulina include:
 Eupyrgulina dautzenbergi (Melvill, 1910)
 Eupyrgulina casta (A. Adams)
 Eupyrgulina comacum (Melvill, 1910)
 ...

References

Pyramidellidae